This is a list of Swedish Navy ships that start with A or B.

A
HSwMS Abborren
HSwMS Alfhild
HSwMS Älvsborg
HSwMS Älvsnabben
HSwMS Äran
HSwMS Arholma
HSwMS Aslög
HSwMS Astrid
HSwMS Astrea
HSwMS Antares
HSwMS Arcturus
HSwMS Altair
HSwMS Argo

B
HSwMS Berserk
HSwMS Björn
HSwMS Balder
HSwMS Bremön
HSwMS Bredskär
HSwMS Braxen
HSwMS Bävern
HSwMS Bris
HSwMS Blixt

Ships of the Swedish Navy